Riding Uphill (Japanese title Gachi Boshi ガチ★星) is a 2018 "local drama" Japanese film created by Nishi-Nihon Television. Directed by Kan Eguchi and starring Kenichi Abe, it shows the life of a downtrodden man who turns to competitive cycling to succeed.

Overview 

This is the second film in Nishi Nihon Television's "local drama" genre (which is designed to bring a spotlight to more local areas of the country and different walks of life in each said area). The first was the 2013 television drama Mentai Piriri (めんたいぴりり), also directed by Kan Eguchi. Mentai Pririri showed the life of a struggling actor living in the Fukuoka Prefecture area. Riding Uphill, too, focuses on the Fukuoka Prefecture lifestyle, and much of the promotional materials and events take place there.

After the success of the 2016 television drama, the footage was re-edited into a 90-minute feature film, which is set to be released in May 2018 by the distribution company Magnetize.

Cast 

 Koji Hamashima - Kenichi Abe
 Hisamatsu Takaaki  - Fukuyama Shota
 Hamashima Yao - Hayashi Mari
 Uesugi Akira - Funasaki Ryo
 Iwashita Yoichiro - Morisaki Kengo
 Irie Kensuke - Ito Koichi
 Fukuda Kenji - Yoshizawa Shogo
 Yayama Shusaku - Nishihara Seigo
 Ramen patron - Hakata Hanamaru
 Konoshita Kazuhide - Moro Morooka
 Matsunaga Mami - Furusaki Hitomi
 Hamashima Kenta - Kimura Sei

Summary 

The story takes place a Kokura Cycling Stadium in Kita-Kyushu.

References

External links 
 
 Official Website (Japanese)
 Magnetize distribution website

''Content in this edit is translated from the existing Japanese Wikipedia article at jp:ガチ★星; see its history for attribution.

Cycling films
Japanese sports drama films
Films set in Kitakyushu
2010s sports drama films
2018 films
2018 drama films
2010s Japanese films